In the Name of the Kaisers is a 1925 German silent film directed by Robert Dinesen and starring Lya De Putti, Hermann Vallentin, and .

Cast

References

Bibliography

External links

1925 films
Films of the Weimar Republic
Films directed by Robert Dinesen
German silent feature films
German black-and-white films
Phoebus Film films